He Fought for the U.S.A. is a 1911 silent film  historical romantic drama short produced by the Essanay Studios and starring Francis X. Bushman. It was distributed by the General Film Company.

Cast
Francis X. Bushman - First Brother
Bryant Washburn - Second Brother
Harry Cashman - Major Langdon
Frank Dayton - Colonel Randolph
Lily Branscombe - Virginia Randolph

See also
Francis X. Bushman filmography

References

External links
 He Fought for the U.S.A. at IMDb.com

1911 films
American silent short films
Essanay Studios films
1911 short films
American black-and-white films
American romantic drama films
1911 romantic drama films
American Civil War films
1910s American films
Silent romantic drama films
Silent American drama films